Archana Nayak (born 27 February 1966) is a member of the 14th Lok Sabha of India. She represents the Kendrapara constituency of Orissa as a member of the Biju Janata Dal (BJD) political party. Before 2009 general elections she resigned from BJD and Joined Bharatiya Janata Party (BJP).In the elections she contested from Bhubaneswar Lok Sabha Constituency.
She is well known as a firebrand leader of the state.

External links
 Members of Fourteenth Lok Sabha - Parliament of India website

People from Kendrapara district
Odisha politicians
India MPs 2004–2009
Biju Janata Dal politicians
1966 births
Living people
Lok Sabha members from Odisha
Women in Odisha politics
People from Khordha district
21st-century Indian women politicians
21st-century Indian politicians